The discography of Danny Brown, an American hip hop recording artist, consists of five studio albums, four extended plays (EPs), nine mixtapes, twenty four singles (including fourteen as a featured artist), two promotional singles and 37 music videos.

Studio albums

Collaborative albums

EPs

Mixtapes

Singles

As lead artist

As featured artist

Promotional singles

Other charted songs

Guest appearances

Music videos

As lead artist

As featured artist

Notes

References

External links
 
 
 

Discographies of American artists
Hip hop discographies